Leskhozny is a rural locality (a settlement) in Khatazhukayskoye Rural Settlement of Shovgenovsky District, the Republic of Adygea, Russia. The population was 6 as of 2018. There are 2 streets.

Geography 
Leskhozny is located 12 km northwest of Khakurinokhabl (the district's administrative centre) by road. Pshizov is the nearest rural locality.

References 

Rural localities in Shovgenovsky District